"Yahhh!" (also known as "Yahhh Bitch Yahhh") is the third single from American rapper Soulja Boy's studio album souljaboytellem.com. It features Arab.

Music video
On January 8, 2008, the video for "Yahhh!" premiered on BET Access Granted.  The video parodies people trying to get Soulja Boy's autograph, including Duane Chapman of Dog the Bounty Hunter, an imitation of Hillary Clinton and an imitation of Britney Spears, who appears to be intoxicated.  The video also featured a stop-motion animated puppet that interacted with the cast.

After the main "Yahhh!" video, a short clip of Soulja Boy's song "Report Card" plays and features Soulja Boy, Arab and others dancing to the song at a school. The video ends with Soulja Boy stating that he "made straight As," and he also tells kids to stay in school.

Critical reception
The song received extremely negative reviews from critics. Alex Fletcher of Digital Spy gave the song one star out of five, and wrote, "Based around Soulja boy and pal Arab screaming incomprehensible gibberish, the repeated line "Yahhh, Trick, Yahhh!" is more irritating than a life's supply of itching powder, while the bargain bucket synth soundtrack sounds like an old Nokia ringtone." Jeff Weiss of LA Weekly wrote that it was a "legitimate attempt to dethrone 'My Humps' for its ignominious distinction as dumbest song ever recorded."

Charts

Weekly charts

Year-end charts

Certifications

References

2007 singles
Soulja Boy songs
Songs written by Soulja Boy
2007 songs
Interscope Records singles
Music videos directed by Dale Resteghini